Xenophanes is a genus of skippers in the family Hesperiidae.

References
Natural History Museum Lepidoptera genus database

Pyrgini
Hesperiidae genera
Taxa named by Frederick DuCane Godman
Taxa named by Osbert Salvin